John Pliny Crysler (February 26, 1801 – April 7, 1881) was a timber merchant and political figure in Canada West.

He was born on Crysler's Farm in 1801, the son of Lt. Col. John Crysler by his first wife Dorothea.  He was a captain in the Dundas County Militia and led his company into action at the Battle of the Windmill of Nov 12-16 1838.  Crysler represented Dundas in the Legislative Assembly of the Province of Canada from 1848 to 1851 and from 1854 to 1857. He was promoted to Lt-Col. and placed in command of the 4th Battalion (Winchester Township), Dundas County Militia in 1859. He was appointed registrar for the County in 1867.  He died at his home in Morrisburg, Ontario on April 7, 1881 at the age of 80.  His wife, the former Mary Westley, predeceased him.

His home, Crysler Hall, is now preserved as part of Upper Canada Village.

References 
Stormont, Dundas & Glengarry: A History, John Graham Harkness (1946)

1801 births
1881 deaths
Members of the Legislative Assembly of the Province of Canada from Canada West
Canadian people of German descent
Canadian people of American descent